Joanne J. Ferrary (born July 20, 1953) is an American politician who has served in the New Mexico House of Representatives from the 37th district since 2017.

Early life and education 
Ferrary was born in Ohio and raised in New Mexico. She earned a Bachelor of Arts degree from the University of New Mexico and a Master of Business Administration from the University of New Mexico Anderson School of Management.

Career 
Prior to entering politics, Ferrary served in the United States Air Force and owned a small business. From 1990 to 1996, she served as the planning director of the New Mexico Department of Transportation Traffic Safety Bureau. She also served as a member of the Las Cruces Planning and Zoning Commission. She was elected to the New Mexico House of Representatives in November 2016 and assumed office in January 2017.

References

1953 births
Living people
Democratic Party members of the New Mexico House of Representatives
21st-century American politicians
Women state legislators in New Mexico
University of New Mexico alumni
21st-century American women politicians